An Internet aesthetic, also simply referred to as an aesthetic, is a visual art style, sometimes accompanied by a fashion style, subculture, or music genre, that usually originates from the Internet or is popularized thereof. Throughout the 2010s and 2020s, online aesthetics gained increasing popularity, specifically on social media platforms such as Tumblr, Pinterest, Instagram and TikTok. The term aesthetic has been described as being "totally divorced from its academic origins", and commonly used as an adjective.

Definition 
Internet aesthetics are characterized and identifiable by their visual style. Sarah Spellings from Vogue stated, Over time, "aesthetic" has evolved from an academic word and something utilized by artists and auteurs to something to categorize our own identities by. It can mean both personal style and a vague stand-in for beauty. 
Kaitlin Tiffany from The Atlantic stated:At this point, the word aesthetic is totally divorced from its academic origins. While Tumblr users mainstreamed it years ago, many teenagers use aesthetic as an all-purpose adjective—"that’s so aesthetic" as a shorthand for "that’s so aesthetically pleasing to me." But in broader Internet parlance, it now means a collection of signifiers or, more precisely, a "vibe."Many names for aesthetics use suffixes, such as -core, which, according to The Washington Post, originates from the word hardcore.

History 
Many Internet aesthetics have been credited with originating on Tumblr, including Dark academia, Cottagecore, Art Hoe, Coquette/Nymphet, and Weirdcore.

Aesthetics Wiki, a wiki hosted on Fandom, has frequently been cited for its large database of information on online aesthetics. According to The Atlantic, the wiki gained a 9,974% increase in traffic during 2020.

In 2022, Rebecca Jennings from Vox argued that many trends from TikTok fall under one trend, calling it "TikTok couture" and describing it as a "way to describe the coalescence of trends that materialize on TikTok, whether from teenagers experimenting with clothes they’ve thrifted from their local charity shop, from older folks revisiting the subcultural styles of their youth, or from professional and amateur trend watchers combining aesthetic clues into a single theory of what’s coming next", adding "with the help of the supercharged TikTok algorithm that blasts viral content to millions of users within hours or days, these videos shape what mainstream culture considers stylish, which therefore can affect what we choose to wear ourselves."

In July 2022, Sarah Spellings from Vogue stated that there was a "rise of hyper-specific Internet aesthetics".

Notable examples

Soft Grunge/2014 Tumblr Girl 

Originally referred to as soft grunge during the early 2010s, the "2014 Tumblr Girl" aesthetic reportedly gained a resurgence of popularity in the early 2020s, specifically by users on TikTok in a nostalgic sense. The aesthetic includes music from artists such as Lana Del Rey, Marina and The Diamonds, The 1975, Arctic Monkeys, and grunge-inspired fashion.

Vaporwave 

Vaporwave is an aesthetic that includes electronic music, visual art style, and memes that emerged in the early 2010s. It is defined partly by its slowed-down, chopped and screwed samples of smooth jazz, elevator, R&B, and lounge music from the 1980s and 1990s. The surrounding subculture is sometimes associated with an ambiguous or satirical take on consumer capitalism and pop culture, and tends to be characterized by a nostalgic or surrealist engagement with the popular entertainment, technology and advertising of previous decades. Visually, it incorporates early Internet imagery, late 1990s web design, glitch art, anime, 3D-rendered objects, and cyberpunk tropes in its cover artwork and music videos.

Seapunk 

Seapunk is a subculture that originated on Tumblr in 2011. It is associated with an aquatic-themed style of fashion, 3D net art, iconography, and allusions to popular culture of the 1990s. Seapunk gained limited popularity as it spread through the Internet, although it was said to have developed a Chicago club scene.

Unicorn Trend 

The Unicorn trend is a tendency to design and consume objects, clothing, and food with a rainbowed and vibrant color palette, which has acquired a strong popularity since 2016, especially among millennials. The unicorn trend is also characterized by a visual value: the kitschy aesthetic of the modern unicorn depiction appeals to people who like posting on social networks colorful and filtered contents to gain likes.

Dark Academia 

Dark Academia is an aesthetic that focuses on higher education, specifically during the 19th century and early 20th century, and Collegiate Gothic architecture, along with a dark color palette. It also reportedly "emphasizes inclusivity and gender fluidity" and "has a dedicated LGBTQ+ following". According to The INSIDER, the aesthetic dates back to 2014 on Tumblr, later getting popularized in 2020 during the COVID-19 pandemic, specifically on TikTok and Instagram. Kristen Bateman from The New York Times states, "Though it’s unclear how and where, exactly, Dark Academia began, many users discovered it on Tumblr".

Neo-Victorian 

Neo-Victorianism is an aesthetic movement that features an overt nostalgia for the Victorian period, generally in the context of the broader hipster subculture of the 1990s-2010s. It is also likened to other "neos" (e.g. neoconservatism, neoliberalism), which do not simply look back to the past but also reiterate and replay it in more diverse and complicated ways. This characteristic makes neo-Victorian art difficult to define conclusively.

Liminal space 

Liminal spaces are the subject of an internet aesthetic portraying empty or abandoned places that appear eerie, forlorn, and often surreal. Liminal spaces are common places of transition (about the concept of liminality) or of nostalgic appeal. Research from the Journal of Environmental Psychology has indicated that liminal spaces may appear eerie or strange because they fall into an uncanny valley of architecture and physical places. The aesthetic gained popularity in 2019 after a post on 4chan depicting a liminal space called the Backrooms went viral. Since then, liminal space images have been posted across the internet, including on Reddit, Twitter, and TikTok.

Cottagecore 

Cottagecore is an aesthetic popularised by teenagers and young adults romanticizing rural life, centering on traditional rural clothing, interior design, and crafts such as drawing, baking, and pottery. The term for the aesthetic was coined in 2018 on Tumblr. The aesthetic gained heavy popularity during the COVID-19 pandemic in 2020, where economic forces and other challenges facing these young people may have been a significant driver of this trend, along with these generations' emphasis on sustainability, and the recent trend to work from home (initially during the pandemic).

Goblincore 

Goblincore is an aesthetic and subculture inspired by the folklore of goblins, centered on the celebration of natural ecosystems usually considered less beautiful by conventional norms, such as soil, animals, and second-hand objects. Proponents of the subculture have also been noted to collect shiny objects, similarly to folklore goblins, such as silverware, small jewelry, and coins. The subculture has been described as connected to maximalism and escapism. Goblincore is believed to have surfaced in online communities in the late 2010s, particularly on Tumblr and TikTok, with Amanda Brennan stating that it "started picking up in spring 2019 and hit full steam in 2020 as people stumbled upon it during the pandemic."

Fairycore 
Fairycore is an aesthetic focusing on imagery and fashion related to fairies. This aesthetic is commonly linked with Goblincore and Cottagecore. Natalie Michie from Fashion Magazine stated the "aesthetic often compromises a hazy pastel colour palette and unconventional fabrics like silk, crochet, and tulle combined to make billowing silhouettes. The goal is to, quite literally, look like a fairy". According to Teen Vogue, Grunge Fairycore, or Fairy Grunge, focuses on neutral, earthy colors, dark color palettes, and "flowy peasant skirts, lace, ripped tights, ribbon, knitted sweaters, leg warmers, and corsets", and some may also wear strap-on wings and pointed ears. The clothes are typically thrifted.

E-Kid 

The E-Girl and E-Boy aesthetics gained popularity on TikTok in 2019. It is an evolution of emo, scene and mall goth fashion combined with Japanese street fashion (such as anime, cosplay, kawaii and lolita fashion) and K-pop fashion. According to Business Insider, the terms are not gender-specific, instead referring to two separate styles of fashion, stating that "While the e-boy is a vulnerable 'softboi' and embraces skate culture, the e-girl is cute and seemingly innocent".

VSCO girl 

VSCO girls or VSCO kids emerged among teenagers around mid- to late-2019. Named after the VSCO photography app, VSCO girls "dress and act in a way that is nearly indistinguishable from one another", using oversized T-shirts, sweatshirts or sweaters, Fjällräven Kånkens, scrunchies, Hydro Flasks, Crocs, Pura Vida bracelets, instant cameras, Carmex, metal straws, friendship bracelets, Birkenstocks, shell necklaces, and other beach-related fashion. Environmentalism, especially topics relating to sea turtle conservation, is also regarded as part of VSCO culture. However, VSCO girls have fallen out of trend, being considered "cringey".

Soft Girl 

Soft Girl or Softie describes a youth subculture that emerged among teenagers around mid-to late-2019. Soft girl is a fashion style, popular among some young women on social media, based on a deliberately cutesy, feminine look with a girly girl attitude. Being a soft girl also may involve a tender, sweet, and vulnerable personality. The trend consists mainly of pastel colors, Y2K, anime, K-pop, and 90s-inspired clothing, as well as cute and nostalgic prints. It parallels some of the Kawaii-centric aesthetics in Japan, but with a more subdued look. The soft girl aesthetic is a subculture that found predominant popularity through the social media app TikTok.

Bisexual lighting 

Bisexual lighting is the simultaneous use of pink, purple, and blue lighting to represent bisexual characters. Some commentators have pointed to the pink and blue color scheme as merely a reference to 1980s aesthetic. It is reminiscent of neon lights and is also associated with retrowave. The trend of bisexual lighting became a popular meme, which gained attention from the LGBTQ+ community in 2017, particularly on social media.

Kidcore/Indie Kid 
The Kidcore or Indie Kid look centers around bright colors and nods to the late 1990s and 2000s. Popularized during 2020 on social media platforms such as Instagram and TikTok, the indie kid aesthetic is characterized by overly saturated photos and "crop tops, baggy pants/jeans, tartan tennis skirts, tight-fitting tops, polo shirts, platform boots or sneakers, as well as skate brands in general", along with Monster Energy also being considered "a staple". Unlike the hipster subculture of the 2010s, indie kids of the 2020s favored a more childlike style that took inspiration from the late 1990s and 2000s, bedroom pop, skater fashion, energy drink culture, and hyper pop. Thrifting was popular across the internet in 2020 due to Gen Z's distaste for fast fashion and a desire to emulate the past. People who influenced this trend include indie rapper Russ and Australian rapper the Kid Laroi.

Clean Girl 
Popularized in 2022 on TikTok, Clean Girl aesthetic, according to Bustle, is "about oversized, sporty basics", and consists of items such as "simple crop tops, loose-fit, high-rise denim, dainty gold jewelry, matching athleisure sets (probably from Aritzia), and the latest Nike drop". According to Refinery29, the aesthetic "is basically just minimalist makeup" and "significantly low effort", citing that as the reason for its popularity.

Barbiecore 
Barbiecore, also known as Bimbocore, is an American and Canadian feminist fashion subculture that reclaims the sexist stereotypes of female celebrities from the 2000s. The trend consists mainly of Bleached blonde hair, Millennial pink, Y2K, Juicy Couture, Von Dutch, Ed Hardy, skimpy skintight clothing, and McBling-inspired fashion accessories to characterize Barbiecore and its Japanese counterpart, Gyaru, as well as pop music define this aesthetic. Barbiecore gained popularity in leftist TikTok communities, which was also criticized for glamorizing the sugar baby lifestyle and adult platforms such as OnlyFans, but that did not end the movement's popularity with Gen Z.

Gorpcore 
Gorp is a style that emerged in the late 2010s – early 2020s. Coined by Jason Chef in 2017, Gorpcore is a futuristic, loose-fitting, outdoors, camping-chic inspired style. The youth in 2022 reuse and get style inspiration from previous generations, while Gorp has emerged in the 2020s, making the up-and-coming style more unique. The style is somewhat open for interpretation because it is fairly new, making it flexible and creative. Although, there are certain patterns and forms that classify an outfit as Gorp. This fashion style coincides with Gen-Zers desire for sustainable fashion, as many of these pieces are easily accessible in vintage or thrift shops while designer pieces can be found on e-commerce stores such as Depop or Thred-up. This style is unisex and reflects how Gen-Zers are breaking heteronormative cultural dress codes and creating an original style unique to the 2020s.

Criticism 
Some online aesthetics have gained criticism. In May 2021, some users on TikTok started the satirical aesthetic "Americancore" to mock those who refer to East Asian cultures as aesthetics, specifically the terms Japancore and Kawaiicore. The trend specifically targeted those who went to Asian grocery stores to film videos, with users of the trend instead going to Wal-Mart, an American supermarket chain, to mock those videos. A freelance culture critic on Vice stated, "These videos, for many people, form a narrative that shapes what outsiders think a particular culture is like, and they’re not meant for Asian people at all in this case because they’re almost treated like museum exhibits". Morgan Sung from Mashable described the Americancore trend as "reverse Orientalism at its finest." In contrast, Kyle Chayka from The New Yorker stated "in attempting to make fun of ignorant white shoppers, some [users] argued, the term ends up mocking the experience of those for whom white American culture really is thrillingly foreign", also stating "as another meme goes, can’t we just let people enjoy things?".

The Clean Girl aesthetic has been criticized for allegedly reinforcing "exclusionary Euro-centric beauty standards" and "[putting] thin, wealthy white women front-and-center as the preeminent aspirational figure on TikTok." Dark Academia has also been called Euro-centric, with Aseel Sahib from Bossy stating, "like many other aesthetics, Dark Academia lacks representation and is inherently Eurocentric". Amal Abdi from Refinery29 stated, "Like cottagecore, though, dark academia has been criticised for its elitism and Eurocentrism, which is to be expected when an entire subculture dedicates itself to the historically white aesthetic of the Western literary canon" along with adding that the aesthetic "has come under fire for romanticising mental health issues, too", yet also stating that "dark academia is liberating for its users through its space for creativity."

See also 
 2010s in fashion
 2020s in fashion
 Internet art
 Internet culture
 New Aesthetic
 Subculture
 Youth subculture

References 

Social media
2010s fads and trends
2020s fads and trends
2010s neologisms
2020s neologisms
Art movements
Cultural trends
Digital art
Fashion
Internet art
Internet culture
Internet memes
Style
Subcultures
Visual arts genres
Youth culture